Buck-Tick (stylized as BUCK-TICK) is a Japanese rock band, formed in Fujioka, Gunma in 1983. The group has consisted of lead vocalist Atsushi Sakurai, lead guitarist Hisashi Imai, rhythm guitarist Hidehiko Hoshino, bassist Yutaka Higuchi and drummer Toll Yagami since 1985. The band has experimented with many different genres of music throughout their four decade career, including punk rock, industrial rock and gothic rock. Buck-Tick are commonly credited as one of the founders of the visual kei movement. They have released 22 studio albums, nearly all reaching the top ten on the charts.

History

Formation (1983–1985)
Buck-Tick was originally formed in 1983. All five of the band members lived in Gunma prefecture. Hisashi Imai originally had the idea for the band, and wanted to start despite not being able to play any instruments at the time. He recruited his friend, Yutaka Higuchi, and the two of them began to practice—Imai on guitar and Higuchi on bass. Then, Higuchi asked Hidehiko Hoshino, who had been his friend since their first year of high school, to join. Higuchi tried to convince Hoshino to become the vocalist because of his looks, but Hoshino was more interested in playing the guitar, and did not want to be in the spotlight, so Imai's friend Araki became the vocalist instead. Atsushi Sakurai, a rebellious loner in Imai's class who hung out with the bad-kid Yankī crowd, volunteered to be the drummer. The Buck-Tick members went to high school with Boøwy singer Kyosuke Himuro.

Imai named the band  in the spring of 1984. Once they had practiced enough to be able to play, they began to perform live at small, local events. They started out playing covers of songs by the famous Japanese punk band The Stalin. From the beginning, they were conscious of their image and tried to differentiate themselves from other bands. They performed in suits with their hair up and soon added white face makeup, as well.

When Imai graduated high school, he moved to Tokyo with Araki and enrolled in a design school. When Higuchi and Hoshino graduated a year later, they also moved to Tokyo—Higuchi for business school and Hoshino for culinary school. However, they returned home on weekends to practice together and play shows. They also began to perform original songs, written by Imai and a few by Hoshino.

Sakurai's parents wouldn't let him move to Tokyo. In the meantime, he decided to become a singer instead of being a drummer. Higuchi's brother Toll Yagami was also in a band, called SP, and when SP lost their vocalist, Sakurai asked Yagami if he could be the replacement. Yagami politely refused his request, and SP broke up. However, at the same time, the rest of Buck-Tick was becoming frustrated with Araki. As Imai's composing skills improved, Araki became unable to carry the melodies to the songs. The band decided to fire Araki, and Sakurai convinced them to accept him as their vocalist. Higuchi convinced Yagami that the best way for him to get over the loss of his own band was to join theirs instead, thus Toll took Sakurai's place behind the drums. This became the final lineup for the band, and has not changed since.

Independent period (1985–1987)
After the change in the lineup, Buck-Tick became more serious about music. When Sakurai's father died, he too moved to Tokyo. The five members worked during the day and practiced and performed at night. Then, in July 1986, they attracted the attention of Sawaki Kazuo, head of Taiyou Records, an independent label. He had seen the band perform at a live house called Shinjuku Attic, and had been very impressed. The band signed to Taiyou Records immediately and released their first single, "To-Search" on October 21 of the same year.

With Sawaki's help they began promoting themselves very actively. They played the live house circuit in Tokyo and on April 1, 1987, released their first album, Hurry Up Mode. In conjunction with the release, they played a live concert called Buck-Tick Phenomenon at the 1,200-capacity Toyoto Public Hall in Ikebukuro. Everyone in the local music scene believed the hall was too large for the band and that the concert would be doomed to failure, but Buck-Tick used an effective advertising strategy: they pasted thousands of eye-catching, black-and-white sticker advertisements all over Tokyo's hip youth districts that read simply "Buck-Tick Phenomenon April 1st Toyoto Public Hall". Their staff members were nearly arrested for defacement of public property. Buck-Tick sold over half the tickets to the show. After the success, major labels began to be interested in the band.

Major label debut (1987–1988)
Major labels began scouting the band but initially they wanted to continue pursuing music on their own terms, and they refused to sign unless the label would agree to their four conditions: first, that the band would be able to make their own decisions about their hair, makeup, clothing, and general image; second, that they would never be forced to change the band lineup; third, that they would never be forced to use session musicians; and last, that they would be able to do all of their own production work. Most record companies refused the idea of accepting such demands from a new band, but Takagaki Ken, of Victor Invitation Records, decided to accept their terms, and offered them Victor's Aoyama studio as a place to practice.

On June 16, 1987, Buck-Tick played a show called Buck-Tick Phenomenon II at the Live Inn in Shibuya to bid farewell to their indie days. Afterward, a video of the concert called Buck-Tick Phenomenon Live at the Live Inn was released, reaching No. 4 on the Oricon video charts.

On September 3, Buck-Tick opened their personal administrative office, which they named Shaking Hands, Inc., in honor of all the musical connections they hoped to make in the future. Soon after, they embarked on their first national tour. They released their first major label album, Sexual XXXXX! on November 21, and it climbed to No. 33 on the Oricon charts. Tickets to their large year-end live in Tokyo at the Japan Youth Hall sold out in two days.

They had become popular enough that they could only play at large halls now. They missed small live houses, so they organized a secret gig under the false name "Bluck-Tlick" at Shinjuku Loft on January 24, 1988, and used it as an opportunity to play their older songs. They released the EP Romanesque on March 21, 1988. Their third album, Seventh Heaven, followed on June 21.

Taboo (1988–1989)
In September 1988, Buck-Tick went to London to record its fourth studio album, Taboo, which was produced by Owen Paul. They also played a gig there, at the Greyhound music club, and amongst those who attended were members of the band Der Zibet, who were also recording in London at the time. The members of Buck-Tick loved London, especially Sakurai, who felt that the music scene there was more welcoming of dark and serious music. With Taboo, the band broke into a darker, more serious sound which took a fair amount of criticism from members of the Japanese music scene who had previously thought of Buck-Tick as little more than idols. The album became the band's first to reach number one on the charts when it was released in January 1989.

Their first major label single "Just One More Kiss", became Buck-Tick's first hit in October 1988. The band made their first live television appearance performing it on the popular music program Music Station. The song was also used in a series of television commercials in which the band appeared advertising Victor's CDian Stereo, with the slogan "The super bass will firecracker." (a pun on Buck-Tick's name, which means "firecracker"). At the end of the year, Buck-Tick won "Rookie of the Year" at the Japan Record Awards.

Hiatus and Aku no Hana (1989–1990)
In March 1989, the band started its Taboo tour. At this point they had stopped putting their hair up that extensively, and Sakurai had even given up on dyeing his and let it be black. The tour was scheduled to run through May, but it was cancelled abruptly when Imai was arrested for LSD possession. The incident was covered in newspapers and tabloids at the time, but since, the band has kept it very quiet. Buck-Tick went on hiatus and Imai had to appear at a court hearing, which was attended by hundreds of concerned fans and was covered on television.

In the fall of 1989, the band went back to the studio and recorded its fifth studio album, Aku no Hana ("Evil Flowers") which was named after Baudelaire's Les Fleurs du Mal (a favorite book of Sakurai's), because the album dealt with similar themes. With Aku no Hana, the band went much further into the dark and gothic image they had begun to explore in Taboo and which would later become their trademark. Aku no Hana became their second consecutive number one album and remains the group's best-selling to date.

Before the album was released they played a huge concert at the Tokyo Dome on December 29 in front of 50,000 people, in order to celebrate their return. It was the largest concert the band had ever played. Since then, the band has held a large concert nearly every year at the end of December, usually at the Nippon Budokan, to celebrate the anniversary of their reunion after Imai's arrest. Since 2001, they have named the concerts The Day in Question, and the shows have often been broadcast live on TV.

Kurutta Taiyou and continuing musical maturity (1990–1995)
In 1990, the band threw themselves back into touring, performing at 51 concerts, and over the summer, released an album called Symphonic Buck-Tick in Berlin, featuring orchestral versions of some of their songs performed by the Berlin Chamber Orchestra. In the fall, they went back to the studio to work on their sixth album, Kurutta Taiyou ("Crazy Sun"). They spent much more time on this album than any of their previous ones, and the difference was noticeable. The sound is much deeper and more sophisticated, using many more studio production effects than previously.

It was at this point that the direction of the band began to change subtly, as Sakurai began to write almost all of the lyrics, and exert his creative influence more. Around this time, he was married to the band's stylist, Sayuri Watanabe, but they quickly divorced (the band later got a new stylist, Mr. Takayuki Tanizaki, who is still working for them). Sakurai's mother, who he had been very close to, also died, and due to the band's busy touring schedule, he was unable to visit her before the end. In interviews, Sakurai said that the pain he felt from these events strongly influenced his lyrics, and that this was when he started writing about real emotions, rather than what he thought was cool. Subsequently, he changed the first kanji in his name from the standard character "" ("sakura") to the older version "", and since then has brought a continuously evolving sense of melancholy and psychological depth to the band's lyrics.

Kurutta Taiyou was released on February 21, 1991. Four days later, the band performed a unique concert called Satellite Circuit, which was recorded in a studio with no audience and then broadcast on television and at special concert halls around the country.

In 1992, Buck-Tick released their first compilation album, Koroshi no Shirabe This Is Not Greatest Hits. As the title suggested, it wasn't a typical "best-of" album. Instead, the band had spent many hours in the studio re-recording (and in some cases radically changing) songs they had already released. A tour followed the album, culminating in a two-day live event called Climax Together, which took place at Yokohama Arena on September 10 and 11. The event had been put together specifically to be filmed, and great care had been taken with the lighting and design—for greater dramatic effect, the stage was even set up along the long side of the hall and obscured by a gigantic scrim which was dropped partway through the set.

On May 21, 1993, Buck-Tick released the single "Dress", which was later re-released in 2005 and used as the opening theme for the Trinity Blood anime. Soon after, on June 23, Buck-Tick released their seventh studio album, Darker Than Darkness -Style 93- a loose concept album focusing on death. The album confused fans because after the last track (track 10), the CD skips and picks up at track 75, which began with strange buzzing noises and slowly evolved into another song. This technique was rare in Japan at that time, and apparently some fans tried to return their CDs to stores, claiming that they were broken. On this album, the band also began to experiment with different instruments—Hoshino played keyboards, and during live shows, Sakurai tried his hand at the saxophone. Both Sakurai and Hoshino played these instruments on the band's next album, Six/Nine.

Released on May 15, 1995, Six/Nine was an even more psychological, conceptual album than Darker Than Darkness -Style 93- had been. Before the album was released, the band had another set of video concerts, featuring equally conceptual music videos for each song, directed by Hayashi Wataru. One of the songs, "Itoshi no Rock Star", featured Issay (Der Zibet) on backing vocals, he also appeared with the band on the tour.

Label and management changes, "cyberpunk" years (1996–2003)
In 1996, Buck-Tick left Shaking Hands Inc, and started their own management company, Banker Ltd., of which Toll is president, and started their new fan club, Fish Tank. On June 21, they released their ninth album, Cosmos, which featured a brighter sound than was usual for the band and also electronic, cyberpunk-influenced music in such songs as "Living on the Net". The tour for the album had to be canceled halfway through. Sakurai, while in Nepal doing a photo shoot for the band, fell seriously ill with peritonitis. When he was told how serious his condition was, he wanted to be flown back to Tokyo so that if he died, he could die at home, but once back in Japan "he felt so relieved that he was able to recover".

In 1997, they changed labels from Victor to Mercury Music Entertainment. They played make-up shows for the concerts that had been canceled the previous year. On December 10, they released their tenth studio album, Sexy Stream Liner, marking the maturation of their new cyberpunk style, which emerged in their visual image as well, with the band sporting "tattoos" and electronic gadgetry on their costumes. Imai began to incorporate the use of a theremin into Buck-Tick's live shows and even into their recordings, beginning with the song "My Fuckin’ Valentine".

On May 13, 1998, they released the single "Gessekai", which was used as the opening theme to the anime series Nightwalker: The Midnight Detective. Shortly after this, on the wave of the anime boom, Japanese music began to gain popularity in the West by the internet, and "Gessekai" became the song that first introduced Buck-Tick to many foreign fans. A remix of the song Dress was also used as a theme song for the anime Trinity Blood.

Later in 1998, and continuing in 1999, Buck-Tick members involved themselves in many collaborations with other artists. However, they continued to release singles as a band and contributed a cover of "Doubt" to Tribute Spirits, an album in memory of hide who died in 1998.

In 2000, Buck-Tick changed labels for a second time, leaving Mercury for BMG Funhouse. Their popularity had been growing overseas, especially in South Korea, and the band went to Korea for the first time. They were greeted enthusiastically by fans at the airport, and they held a formal interview, but did not perform live. Later, in 2001, they returned to Korea and played at the Dongducheon Rock Festival (a.k.a. "SoYo Rock Festival") in Seoul. It poured rain on the day of the festival and the band were drenched during their set, but nonetheless, the crowd was ecstatic.

On September 20, 2000, the band released One Life, One Death, their first studio album in nearly three years, and played a tour to support the album. In addition to this, Sakurai and Imai became involved in a supergroup called Schwein, with Raymond Watts and Sascha Konietzko, which released two albums and toured Japan in August 2001.

On March 6, 2002, Buck-Tick released their twelfth studio album, Kyokutou I Love You, which was initially scheduled to be released as a double album with Mona Lisa Overdrive. Ultimately the two were released separately and Mona Lisa Overdrive came out the following year in February. However musically, the two albums feed into each other in a continuous loop. The last track on Kyokutou I Love You is an instrumental which becomes the bottom musical layer of the first track on Mona Lisa Overdrive. Likewise, the last track on Mona Lisa Overdrive contains samples from the first track on Kyokutou I Love You. The album title Mona Lisa Overdrive is mistakenly thought to have been inspired by William Gibson's cyberpunk novel of the same name but guitarist Hisashi Imai originally confused it with Robert Longo's work Samurai Overdrive, which inspired the album title.

Buck-Tick opened for Marilyn Manson when he played at Tokyo Bay NK Hall and Osaka-jo Hall in September 2003.

Solo projects and "gothic" years (2004–2005)
In 2004, Buck-Tick largely suspended activities in order for the band members to work on their individual musical projects. The only band member who did not release music during this time was Hoshino, who went on to form the band Dropz two years later in 2006. Buck-Tick did play a few shows together, including one at Yokohama Arena in 2004 that was a reprise of their "Climax Together" shows 12 years before. The show was released on DVD as Akuma to Freud -Devil and Freud- Climax Together.

April 6, 2005 saw the release of Juusankai wa Gekkou which also happened to be the band's fourteenth  studio album. It was a concept album inspired by Sakurai's solo project that focused on the idea of "Goth", and despite the residual gothic image Buck-Tick had been cultivating for years, it was a significant departure from any of their previous work. Special care was taken with the sets and costumes for the tour. The live shows were very dramatic, and the band even hired a clown and a ballerina  to perform with them at some of the shows. A BARKS journalist called the show a "gothic theatre" and an illusion between dream and reality. At this time, visual kei and Gothic & Lolita had been growing significantly in popularity and with Juusankai wa Gekkou, Buck-Tick gained a large number of new fans domestically and overseas who admired the gothic style.

On December 21, the tribute album Parade -Respective Tracks of Buck-Tick- was released, which contains covers of their own songs performed by 13 different artists, including Kiyoharu, J, Abingdon Boys School and Rally (composed of members from Glay, Thee Michelle Gun Elephant and The Mad Capsule Markets). It reflected the influence Buck-Tick had on younger generation musicians in Japan, and later in 2007, some of these artists performed at a festival dedicated to the band, which was released on DVD.

20th Anniversary and "straight rock" years (2006–2011)
In 2006, as Buck-Tick prepared to celebrate their 20th anniversary as a major-label band, they released the single "Kagerou", which was used as the ending theme for the XxxHolic anime.

On June 6, 2007, they released the single "Rendezvous", and on the same day embarked on the Parade Tour, finally celebrating their anniversary and tribute album. The tour had a unique format: at each show, a different artist from the tribute album, performed with Buck-Tick. The tour culminated in a giant festival called "Buck-Tick Fest 2007 on Parade", which was held on September 8 at Minato Mirai in the Yokohama port. It lasted all day and featured all 13 artists off the tribute album. Each of the guest artists and Buck-Tick played a set, and as a grand finale, there was a fireworks show over the bay.

Soon after this, on September 19, 2007, Buck-Tick released their fifteenth studio album, Tenshi no Revolver ("Angel's Revolver"). Though they continued using a few gothic elements, they discarded the use of synth for this album, the concept for which was a "band sound". The band held a long national tour to support the album, which lasted until December. Also in December, the Japanese cellphone company SoftBank released special-edition Buck-Tick mobile phones that had been designed by the band members.

At the end of 2008, BMG Japan was bought out by Sony Music Entertainment Japan and operated independently still as BMG until early 2009 where a company reorganization folded BMG completely into Sony. Thus he band officially became a Sony Music Entertainment Japan artist, signed to the Ariola Japan subsidiary.

The band released their next album, titled Memento Mori, on February 18, 2009. According to Sakurai, this album continues to explore the idea of "straight rock". After the release of the album, they then went on to perform an extended concert tour spanning three months, with 25 performances in total. The final two concerts were held at Tokyo's NHK Hall.

In March 2010, the group released the single "Dokudanjou Beauty". The second single of 2010 was released on September 1 titled "Kuchizuke" ("Kisses"), which was used as the opening theme for Fuji TV's Shiki anime. On October 13, Buck-Tick released its seventeenth studio album titled Razzle Dazzle. For the most part, it continued the straightforward rock sound, but also contained many instances of dance-rock or dance music. It also included cover artwork by graphic artist Aquirax Uno.

Buck-Tick's song "Jupiter" was covered by DuelJewel on the compilation Crush! -90's V-Rock Best Hit Cover Songs-, which was released on January 26, 2011 and features current visual kei bands covering songs from bands that were important to the '90s visual kei movement. Their song "Speed" was covered by 9Goats Black Out on its sequel, Crush! 2 -90's V-Rock Best Hit Cover Songs-, that was released on November 23, 2011.

25th Anniversary and Lingua Sounda (2012–2021)
To celebrate their 25th anniversary, Buck-Tick opened a special website where they announced the creation of their own record label Lingua Sounda, and that its first releases will be a new single in spring 2012 and an album in the summer. They released two separate boxsets in March 2012, one containing work from 1987 to 1999 and the other from 2000 to 2010, titled Catalogue Victor→Mercury 87–99 and Catalogue Ariola 00–10 respectively. The single "Elise no Tame ni" was released on May 23, the same day as the DVD of their 2011 Day in Question concert. The band also performed the theme song for the play Tenshu Monogatari. Their next single, "Miss Take ~Boku wa Miss Take~", was released on July 4. Fans who ordered both "Miss Take" and "Elise" had a chance to win tickets to the band's promotional video shoot for the new song "Climax Together".

A second tribute album to Buck-Tick was released on July 7, titled Parade II -Respective Tracks of Buck-Tick- it featured 13 artists including acid android, Polysics and Acid Black Cherry. The band released their eighteenth studio album, Yume Miru Uchuu, on September 19 before holding Buck-Tick Fest 2012 On Parade on September 22 and 23, which attracted an estimated 14,000 fans and included bands who appear on the tribute album such as D'erlanger, Mucc, Merry, Pay money To my Pain, and others.

The special 25th Anniversary film Buck-Tick ~Buck-Tick Phenomenon was shown in theaters in two parts in 2013, part one opening on June 15 and two on June 22, each for one week only. The band wrote two new songs exclusive for the film, "Love Parade" composed by Hoshino and "Steppers -Parade-" by Imai. Buck-Tick released the single "Keijijou Ryuusei" on May 14, 2014, and their nineteenth studio album, Arui wa Anarchy, on June 4.

On June 28, 2015, Buck-Tick performed at the Lunatic Fest hosted by Luna Sea and were joined onstage by J for "Iconoclasm". At the end of their Day in Question concert on December 29, 2015, the band announced their return to Victor Entertainment with Lingua Sounda becoming its sub label. On September 11, 2016 the group played the live show entitled Climax Together 3rd at Yokohama Arena, 12 years after their second one and 24 years after their first one. Buck-Tick released the single "New World" on September 21, 2016, and their twentieth studio album Atom Miraiha No.9 on September 28 which peaked 9th on the Oricon album chart.

Buck-Tick won the special "Inspiration Award Japan" at the 2017 MTV Video Music Awards Japan. Their single "Babel" was released on November 15, 2017. Following the February 21, 2018, release of its second single "Moon Sayonara wo Oshiete", Buck-Tick's twenty-first album No.0 was released on March 14. They performed on the first night of the special hide 20th Memorial Super Live Spirits event at Tokyo Otaiba Yagai Tokusetsu Stage J Chikuon on April 28, 2018, in memory of X Japan's guitarist, hide. On December 9, 2018, Sakurai was visibly unwell during Buck Tick's concert at Zepp Divercity, but he insisted on finishing the performance. After the concert, he was diagnosed with gastrointestinal bleeding and subsequent shows had to be postponed for his treatment.

In 2020, Buck-Tick released the single "Datenshi" on January 29. A fan club tour was announced, but postponed due to the COVID-19 pandemic in Japan. Another new single, "Moonlight Escape", was released on August 26. On July 22, 2020, the band announced their new album, Abracadabra, released on September 21.

In September 2021, they released a single titled "Go-Go BT Train" and announced a nation-wide tour despite the COVID-19 pandemic.

35th anniversary (2022–present)
In June 2022, the band announced its plans for their 35th debut anniversary. They will release a special concept best-of album titled CATALOGUE THE BEST 35th anniv.. During autumn, the band will play several large-scale concerts at the Yokohama Arena to celebrate the anniversary.

Music style

Buck-Tick's music has changed and evolved hugely over the course of their career. Their early work is what the Japanese call "positive punk". It used simple rhythms and chords, with the songs mostly in major keys and using some English words in the lyrics. Starting with 1989's Taboo, they experimented with a darker sound, which grew more mature with Kurutta Taiyou in 1991. Darker Than Darkness -Style 93- delved into a harsher industrial rock sound which continued all the way up through Mona Lisa Overdrive in 2003. More recently, with 2005's Juusankai wa Gekkou, they have deliberately adopted a "goth" concept, which they combined with a retro straight rock sound for the albums Tenshi no Revolver (2007) and Memento Mori (2009). Their next album, 2010's Razzle Dazzle, then incorporated many instances of dance-rock.

Influence
Some elements that persist throughout their music are resounding, jangling guitar chords, throbbing, prominent bass lines, harsh roars of electronically distorted noise, and ambivalent melodies that wander between major and minor keys, as well as Sakurai's distinctive rich baritone voice. Jrockrevolution described the band's style as having gone "from the bubbly sounds of pop to the buzz of electronic cyberpunk to lustful velvety goth to the smooth style of hard rock and back again". Sakurai, who is the main lyricist of the band, is famous for the erotic decadence of his lyrics (which are now predominantly in Japanese), but he also often addresses existential psychological themes. His lyrics is also described as "dance in a daydream about reality". The song "Rakuen (Inori Koinegai)" caused controversy because some of the lyrics were lifted from the Quran and later the album was re-issued with the offending part removed by November 1995. Imai, the main composer, has written many songs that read like science fiction stories, involving genetic engineering and computer hackers, but more recently has branched out into simple love songs.

Buck-Tick was most strongly influenced by Western rock, especially British post-punk from the 1970s and 1980s, though they cite a few Japanese influences as well. The influences that the band members collectively name the most often are Love & Rockets, Robert Smith, and Bauhaus (the band admitted to going together to see Peter Murphy live.) They also mention the Sex Pistols and XTC. Imai was especially influenced by Love & Rockets, and this is very evident on Buck-Tick's album Kurutta Taiyou. He was also influenced by Yellow Magic Orchestra, Kraftwerk, Ultravox and other new wave and electronica acts, and the punk band The Stalin. Sakurai was hugely influenced by David Bowie, and he even played a cover of Bowie's song "Space Oddity" at his solo live in 2004. He is also influenced by post-punk/first wave goth acts such as The Sisters of Mercy, Siouxsie and the Banshees, Clan of Xymox, and  Der Zibet and Masami Tsuchiya. He claims to love "dark" music in general. Hoshino and Yagami love The Beatles. Yagami is also a fan of Led Zeppelin and other classic metal/punk acts like Kiss and The Clash.

Regarded as one of the founders of visual kei, Buck-Tick have influenced as many bands and musicians as they have been influenced by. Kiyoharu (Kuroyume, Sads) interviewed Sakurai twice on his personal radio show in conjunction with Buck-Tick's anniversary festival and declared Sakurai to be "so hot" and "a wonderful person". Takanori Nishikawa is another open fan of Buck-Tick, and interviewed the entire band on the TV program Pop Jam. Dir en grey vocalist Kyo was inspired to become a rock star after seeing a picture of Sakurai on the desk of a junior high school classmate. Likewise, his bandmate Die became interested in rock music in junior high after hearing Aku no Hana. D vocalist Asagi listed Buck-Tick as one of their biggest influences. His bandmate Tsunehito named Buck-Tick as one of his two favorite Japanese bands. Nagoya kei band Deadman cited Buck-Tick as an inspiration. Show Ayanocozey also cited Buck-Tick as an influence. Well-known visual kei rock musicians Tatsurou (Mucc), Yuu (Merry), Aie (Deadman), Lay (Fatima) and Tsuyoshi (Karimero) formed a Buck-Tick cover band called Bluck-Tlick in 2001.

Band members
Current members
  – lead vocals, saxophone, tambourine (1985–present), drums (1983–1985)
  – lead guitar, backing vocals, theremin, occasional lead vocals (1983–present)
  – rhythm guitar, backing vocals, keyboards (1983–present)
  – bass (1983–present)
  – drums, percussion (1985–present)

Former members
  – lead vocals (1983–1985)

Discography

 Hurry Up Mode (1987)
 Sexual XXXXX! (1987)
 Seventh Heaven (1988)
 Taboo (1989)
 Aku no Hana (1990)
 Kurutta Taiyou (1991)
 Darker Than Darkness -Style 93- (1993)
 Six/Nine (1995)
 Cosmos (1996)
 Sexy Stream Liner (1997)
 One Life, One Death (2000)

 Kyokutou I Love You (2002)
 Mona Lisa Overdrive (2003)
 Juusankai wa Gekkou (2005)
 Tenshi no Revolver (2007)
 Memento Mori (2009)
 Razzle Dazzle (2010)
 Yume Miru Uchuu (2012)
 Arui wa Anarchy (2014)
 Atom Miraiha No.9 (2016)
 No.0 (2018)
 Abracadabra (2020)

References

External links
 Official website

 
Visual kei musical groups
Japanese alternative rock groups
Japanese gothic rock groups
Japanese punk rock groups
Musical groups established in 1983
Musical quintets
Musical groups from Gunma Prefecture
Japanese industrial rock musical groups
Sibling musical groups